HMS Thorn was a Clydebank three funnel - 30 knot destroyer purchased by the Royal Navy under the 1899–1900 Naval Estimates. She was the second ship to carry this name since it was introduced in 1779 for a 16-gun sloop sold in 1816.

Construction and career
She was laid down as a speculative build yard number 334 at the John Brown and Company shipyard in Clydebank and was launched on 17 March 1900. She was then acquired by the Royal Navy on 31 March 1900. She was completed and accepted by the Royal Navy in June 1901.

After commissioning she was assigned to the Channel Fleet in the Devonport Flotilla. She spent her operational career mainly in Home Waters.

On 30 August 1912 the Admiralty directed all destroyer classes were to be designated by alphabetical characters starting with the letter 'A'. Since her design speed was 30 knots and she had three funnels she was assigned to the 'C' class. After 30 September 1913, she was known as a C-class destroyer and had the letter 'C' painted on the hull below the bridge area and on either the fore or aft funnel.

World War I and disposition 
July 1914 found her in active commission with the 7th Flotilla based at Devonport. In August 1914 the 7th Flotilla was deployed to the Humber River. Her employment with the 7th Flotilla included participating in anti-submarine and counter mining patrols. In November 1916 she was deployed to Londonderry Port, Ireland.  Here her duties included anti-submarine and counter mining patrols and escorting merchant vessels.

By December 1918 she was paid off and laid up in reserve awaiting disposal.  She was broken up at Portsmouth Dockyard in 1919.

Pennant numbers

References
NOTE:  All tabular data under General Characteristics only from the listed Jane's Fighting Ships volume unless otherwise specified

Bibliography

External links
 "Arrowsmith" List: Royal Navy WW1 Destroyer Pendant Numbers

 

Ships built on the River Clyde
1900 ships
C-class destroyers (1913)
World War I destroyers of the United Kingdom